History of Lithuania or Academic History of Lithuania is a thirteen-volume series of books dedicated to the history of Lithuania. Its first volume was published in 2005, and its last volume is scheduled for publication in 2011. After its completion it will be the largest and the most comprehensive academic publication covering Lithuania's history ever released.  As of 2011 five volumes had been released.

Background

After Lithuania regained its independence from the Soviet union in 1990, a number of academic works were published by prominent historians of the state's history. These included Edvardas Gudavičius‘  "Lietuvos istorija. Nuo seniausių laikų iki 1569 metų" in 1999;  Zigmantas Kiaupa's "Lietuvos valstybės istorija" in 2004; and Alfredas Bumblauskas’  "Senosios Lietuvos istorija 1009–1795" in 2005. However, the majority of these were dedicated to specific time frames and did not cover the entire period from prehistory to the modern era. The first proposal to issue a complete history may be credited to professor Antanas Tyla. The suggestion was reinforced by academic Vytautas Merkys. The opportunity to issue a fundamental and comprehensive academic work arose in 2000, when a programme sponsored by the Lithuanian Institute of History, coordinated by prof. habil. dr. Jūratė Kiaupienė, was approved.

Per the approved programme, each volume of the Academic History will cover a particular historical time frame, and its thirteen volumes will encompass Lithuania's entire history. After its completion it will be the largest academic publication covering Lithuania's history ever released and will include the latest research findings. Its intent is to transcend narrow historical perspectives and to focus on the evolution of Lithuania. Political, ethical, confessional, and judicial themes will be covered in a European context, and the modern works of Ukrainian, Russian and other states' historians will be examined.

Initially twelve volumes were planned, but after the work began it became evident that coverage of modern Lithuanian history would require an additional volume. The successive volumes will be the same size - 25.5 cm x 16.5 cm. The editorial board of the series consists of the following scholars: habil. dr. Algirdas Girininkas, dr. Artūras Dubonis, prof. dr. Zigmantas Kiaupa, prof. habil. dr. Jūratė Kiaupienė, dr. Česlovas Laurinavičius, dr. Rimantas Miknys, dr. Gintautas Sliesoriūnas, and dr. Gintautas Zabiela. More than 20 scholars are working on this project. Each volume is peer reviewed and has an additional responsible editor. The Lithuanian Institute of History is acting in cooperation with Lithuanian universities, including Vilnius University, increasing scholarly involvement in the project.

Volume I

The series' first volume, "Lietuvos istorija. Akmens amžius ir ankstyvasis metalų leikotrapis", was released in 2005. This volume covers the period between the end of the last ice age and the first written mention of the inhabitants in the Baltic region. It covers approximately 10,000 years, investigating the development of communities during the paleolithic, mesolithic, and Neolithic eras and the Bronze Age in a local and European context. Forest dwellers are examined along with agrarian societies. It features an improved periodisation of epochs, and social developments are analyzed using not only archaeological findings, but the methodologies of the natural sciences as well. The genesis and evolution of particular local cultures such as mesolithic Nemunas and Neolithic Nemunas is discussed.

The 357-page volume was written by authors known for their field work in archeology and the prehistory of Lithuania: dr. Tomas Ostrauskas, dr. Vygandas Juodagalvis, hab. dr. Algirdas Girininkas ir dr. Džiugas Brazaitis. Its responsible editor was Algirdas Girininkas. The volume was peer reviewed by prof. habil. dr. Vladas Žulkus and dr. Algimantas Merkevičius.

Volume II

The second volume, entitled "Lietuvos istorija. Geležies amžius", was issued in 2007. It encompasses the era between the 1st century and the 12th century. Invoking archaeological research, it discusses Lithuania's formation and development, and the impacts made by the Vikings and by Rus. An in-depth analysis was made of the evolution of the Baltic tribes in the region, since these Lithuanians were the only Balts to create their own state.

The volume was written by dr. Gintautas Zabiela, habil. dr. Vytautas Kazakevičius, dr. Ilona Vaškevičiūtė, dr. Rasa Banytė Rowell, and dr. Darius Baronas; the responsible editor was Gintautas Zabiela. During the volume's preparation, Vytautas Kazakevičius died, and his work was finished by Zabiela.  The 517-page volume was peer reviewed by dr. Albinas Kuncevičius and dr. Mindaugas Bertašius.

Volume XII

In 2008 was released another volume of the book entitled "Sąjūdis: nuo "Persitvarkymo" iki Kovo 11-osios". Volume is written by dr. Česlovas Laurinavičius and dr. Vladas Sirutavičius. Currently available I part of the XII volume.

Volumes III through XIII

The third volume will begin with the 12th century; the thirteenth and last volume will cover the 21st century. The last volume is scheduled for release in about 2011. According to a preliminary assessment, the remaining volumes will be organized and edited as follows:

References

2007 books
2005 books
Lithuanian books